"Til the Rivers All Run Dry" is a song recorded by American country music artist Don Williams, who co-wrote it with Wayland Holyfield.  It was released in December 1975 as the first single from the album Harmony.  The song was Williams' fourth number one on the country chart.  The single stayed at number one for one week and spent a total of twelve weeks on the country charts.

Cover versions include the Pete Townshend / Ronnie Lane version on their "Rough Mix" album and by Carla Olson & Rob Waller on 2013's Have Harmony, Will Travel.

Charts

Weekly charts

Year-end charts

References

1976 singles
Don Williams songs
Songs written by Wayland Holyfield
Songs written by Don Williams
ABC Records singles
Dot Records singles
1975 songs